Ligario is a surname. Notable people with the surname include:

 Cesare Ligario (1716–after 1755), Italian painter
 Giovanni Pietro Ligario (1686–1748), Italian painter and architect
 Quintus Ligarius (1st century BC), Roman general